Edward Samuel Appleton (February 29, 1892 – January 27, 1932) was born in Arlington. He was a pitcher in Major League Baseball who played for the Brooklyn Robins in the 1915 and 1916 seasons. Appleton was the victim of a trick by St Louis Cardinals manager Miller Huggins during a 1915 game. Tied in the 7th inning, and with two outs for the Cardinals and a runner on third base, Huggins called out to Appleton 'Let me see that ball'. Appleton tossed the ball to Huggins, who stepped aside. The ball flew past him and the Cardinal runner scored.  The Robins protested, but the umpire told them that because time had not been called, the ball was still in play and Appleton was throwing it at his own risk.

References

External links

1892 births
1932 deaths
Baseball players from Texas
Major League Baseball pitchers
Brooklyn Robins players
Fort Worth Panthers players
Seattle Giants players
Wichita Falls Spudders players
Cleburne Generals/Scouts players
Ardmore Producers players
Ardmore Snappers players
Greenville Staplers players
Marshall Indians players
Greenville Hunters players
Mexia Gushers players
People from Arlington, Texas
Terrell Terrors players